Shahidul Islam is a first-class cricketer from Bangladesh.  He was born on 25 January 1982 in Jhalakati, Khulna and is sometimes referred to by his nickname Saikat. He scored 30 and 5 in his only first-class cricket match, for Barisal Division in 2001–02, but went for over a hundred runs without taking a wicket.

References

Bangladeshi cricketers
Barisal Division cricketers
1982 births
Living people
Bangladeshi cricket coaches
Bangladesh Central Zone cricketers

ta:சொகைல் இசுலாம்